Broad Park is an unincorporated community in Jefferson Township, Putnam County, in the U.S. state of Indiana.

History
A post office was established at Broad Park in 1892, and remained in operation until it was discontinued in 1903. The name of the community was derived from the names of two local landowners, J. C. Broadstreet and Hugh Parker.

Geography

References

Unincorporated communities in Putnam County, Indiana
Unincorporated communities in Indiana